Montrose is an unincorporated community located near the intersection of Dutch Lane Road (County Route 46) and Boundary Road along the border of Colts Neck and Marlboro townships in Monmouth County, New Jersey, United States. The town was located in "Atlantic Township" at one time prior to the name being changed to "Colts Neck". Prior to being called Montrose, the area was called "Barrentown".

The community was electrified in 1928, the fire department was formed in 1926, and a rural mail route was established in 1905.

Farming 
The farms in the area were known for many items, mostly dairy cows, horses, potatoes, and peaches. In 1929, John Koster was noted to have a large greenhouse and sold flowers.

Historic schoolhouse 
The area is known for the historic one-room Montrose Schoolhouse, built before 1786, which is located in the Colts Neck portion of the community. It was used for many years as a meeting place, religious meeting house, and school house. It last held school classes in 1922, and the last known school bus driver was James Danser.

The schoolhouse was donated to the Colts Neck Historical Society by George Illmensee prior to 1968. It was moved to its present location in 1967 due to building a subdivision. Prior to moving it was located on Montrose Road and Cedar Drive. It was restored at a cost of $1006.57.

Hunt club 
For many years, Montrose was one of the starting locations for the Monmouth County Hunt. Sometimes numbering as many as 100 hunters, the community hunts would meet at the Montrose School house, prior to starting out. Fox and rabbits were the focus of the hunts.

References

Colts Neck Township, New Jersey
Marlboro Township, New Jersey
Unincorporated communities in Monmouth County, New Jersey
Unincorporated communities in New Jersey